Eustace Loveridge (14 April 1891 – 29 July 1959) was an Australian cricketer. He played in five first-class matches for South Australia between 1920 and 1923.

See also
 List of South Australian representative cricketers

References

External links
 

1891 births
1959 deaths
Australian cricketers
South Australia cricketers
Cricketers from Adelaide